Spas Gulev (born 20 September 1971) is a Bulgarian biathlete. He competed in the men's sprint event at the 1992 Winter Olympics.

References

1971 births
Living people
Bulgarian male biathletes
Olympic biathletes of Bulgaria
Biathletes at the 1992 Winter Olympics
Place of birth missing (living people)